In physics, and in particular relativity, an event is the instantaneous physical situation or occurrence associated with a point in spacetime (that is, a specific place and time). For example, a glass breaking on the floor is an event; it occurs at a unique place and a unique time. Strictly speaking, the notion of an event is an idealization, in the sense that it specifies a definite time and place, whereas any actual event is bound to have a finite extent, both in time and in space.

Upon choosing a frame of reference, one can assign coordinates to the event: three spatial coordinates  to describe the location and one time coordinate  to specify the moment at which the event occurs. These four coordinates  together form a four-vector associated to the event.

One of the goals of relativity is to specify the possibility of one event influencing another. This is done by means of the metric tensor, which allows for determining the causal structure of spacetime. The difference (or interval) between two events can be classified into spacelike, lightlike and timelike separations. Only if two events are separated by a lightlike or timelike interval can one influence the other.

See also 
 Relativity of simultaneity

References

zh-yue:事件 (相對論)
Theory of relativity
Terms in science and technology